John Weeks may refer to:

 John Weeks (bishop) (died 1857), Anglican bishop
  (born 1934), British composer and winner of the 1982 Queen Elisabeth Competition
 John Weeks (economist) (1941–2020), American economist
 John Weeks (painter) (1886–1965), New Zealand painter
 John D. Weeks, American chemist
 John E. Weeks (1853–1949), U.S. Representative from Vermont, and Governor of Vermont
 John W. Weeks (1860–1926), U.S. Senator from Massachusetts and Secretary of War
 John W. Weeks (New Hampshire politician) (1781–1853), U.S. Representative from New Hampshire
 John H. Weeks, American soldier and Medal of Honor recipient

See also
 Jon Weeks (born 1986), American football player
 Johnny Weeks, a fictional character on the television series The Wire
 John Meeks (1839–1899), English-born Australian politician